Shroder Paideia High School, also known as Shroder Paideia Academy or Shroder High School, is a public junior high and high school (7-12) located in the Madisonville neighborhood of Cincinnati, Ohio. It is part of the Cincinnati Public Schools.

The school is a team-based magnet school dedicated to the Paideia philosophy. The Paideia philosophy is based upon the belief that all students can be successful in a rigorous college preparatory curriculum. Their classroom instruction includes direct, didactic teaching, 
coaching activities and in-depth seminar discussions.

Notes and references

External links
 Official website

Cincinnati Public Schools
High schools in Hamilton County, Ohio
Public high schools in Ohio
Magnet schools in Ohio